The Empty Beach is a 1985 Australian thriller film starring Bryan Brown as private investigator Cliff Hardy inquires into the disappearance of a beautiful woman's wealthy husband from Bondi Beach. Based on the 1983 novel by Peter Corris of the same name.

Cast
Bryan Brown as Cliff Hardy
Anna Maria Monticelli as Anne Winter
Belinda Giblin as Marion Singer
Ray Barrett as McLean
John Wood as Parker
Peter Collingwood as Ward
Nick Tate as Henneberry
Kerry Mack as Hildegard
Joss McWilliam as Tal
Sally Cooper as Sandy Modesto
Rhys McConnochie as Garth Green
Steve Rackman as Rex
Robert Alexander as Bob
Bob Barrett as Johnno
Christopher Lewis as Aldo
Steve J. Spears as Manny
Kerry Dwyer as Mary Mahoud
Dean Nottle as Mercer
Robert Noble as Pinball Manager
Simone Taylor as Sharon
Harry Lawrence as Leon
Alexander Hay as Edgar Montefiore
Philomena Loneragan as Peggy
Peggy Wallach as Rose
Brian Anderson as Clyde
Deborah Kennedy as Newspaper Librarian
Robert Shannon as Detective
John Godden as Detective's Victim
Rebecca Smart as Little Girl
Aaron Smart as Little Boy
Kelly Dingwall as Head Punk
Barry Leane as John Singer
Phillip Ross as Bill Winter
Katherine Summers as Journalist

Production
In the early 1980s Bryan Brown was attached to star as Cliff Hardy in an adaptation of an earlier Corris novel, White Meat. This was to be adapted by Corris, directed by Stephen Wallace and produced by Richard Mason. However no film eventuated. Then John Edwards and Tim Read acquired the rights to the series and approached Brown again. He had played the character in a 1978 Albie Thoms feature film “Palm Beach” prior to the filming and release of “The Empty Beach”.

To coincide with the film release the same title song was released as a single that summer of 1985 by Marc Hunter of Dragon with backing vocals featured from Canadian-Australian based singer Wendy Matthews. Music video of the single also had some moderate TV airplay which features both Marc Hunter and Wendy Matthews.

Corris wrote the first few drafts and was unhappy with the final adaptation, although he liked Bryan Brown's performance.

Release
The film performed poorly at the box office in Australia although it sold widely around the world. There were plans for Brown to appear in further Hardy adventures but this did not eventuate. Ten network first screened the feature film at 8.30pm in early October 1986 on a Wednesday night with a repeat screening again in early 1990s at  a much later time-slot and has not screened commercially since. The Empty Beach film is also awaiting a dvd or blu-Ray release.

References

External links

The Empty Beach at Oz Movies

Australian thriller films
1985 films
1985 thriller films
Films based on Australian novels
Films directed by Chris Thomson (director)
1980s English-language films
1980s Australian films